Yuri Petrovich Izyumov (December 4, 1932 in Moscow – 9 February 2021) was a Soviet and Russian journalist and author, politician. From 1970 to 1980, he was an assistant to the First Secretary of the Moscow City Committee of the Communist Party Viktor Grishin. He was a Deputy of the Mossoviet.

He graduated with honors from the Faculty of Journalism of Moscow State University.

From 1957 to 1961, he was deputy editor-in-chief of the "Moskovskij Komsomolets".

From 1980 to 1990, he was first deputy editor-in-chief of the "Literaturnaya Gazeta".

He was also deputy editor-in-chief of the "Pionerskaya Pravda" and "Vechernyaya Moskva".

Honours and awards
 Honoured Cultural Worker of the RSFSR
 Order of Lenin

References

1932 births
2021 deaths
20th-century Russian journalists
21st-century Russian journalists
Journalists from Moscow

Communist Party of the Soviet Union members
Recipients of the Order of Friendship of Peoples
Recipients of the Order of Lenin
Recipients of the Order of the Red Banner of Labour
Russian editors
Russian male journalists
Soviet editors
Soviet journalists